Byne may refer to:

People
 John Byne (1635–1661), English landowner and politician
 John Byne Skerrett (1777–1814), British soldier
 Mildred Stapley Byne (1875-1941), American art historian

Places
 Byne House, England

Other
 Byne's disease

See also
 Byrne, a surname
 Bine (disambiguation)